Broken Fetters is a 1916 American silent drama film written and directed by Rex Ingram. Violet Mersereau played the lead role. The film was shot in Fort Lee, New Jersey where Universal Studios and other early film studios in America's first motion picture industry were based at the beginning of the 20th century.

Production
Broken Fetters was produced by Bluebird Photoplays, one of the three brands of motion pictures then being released by Universal Film Manufacturing Company.

Cast
Kittens Reichert as Mignon, as a child
Violet Mersereau as Mignon, grown up
Charles Francis as Kong Hee
Earl Simmons as Bruce King
Frank Smith as Foo Shai
William Dyer as The Captain
Paul Panzer as Carleton Demarest
Isabel Patterson as Mrs. Demarest
William Garwood as Lawrence Demarest
Paddy Sullivan as Mike
Guy Morville as The Detective
Charles Fang as Chang

References

External links

1916 drama films
1916 films
Silent American drama films
American silent feature films
American black-and-white films
Films directed by Rex Ingram
Films shot in Fort Lee, New Jersey
Universal Pictures films
1910s American films